Televisión Educativa (Spanish: "Educational Television") can refer to services in these countries:

Televisión Educativa (Colombia)
Televisión Educativa (Mexico), also known as Edusat